Blossom is a hamlet in the town of Elma in Erie County, New York, United States. It was originally founded by the Ebenezer Society as Upper Ebenezer in 1844. The origin of the present name is not known, but it may have come from the profusion of apple blossoms in the area.

References

External Links 

 Buffalo in the '50s:  Elma's Blossom GLF mill

Hamlets in New York (state)
Hamlets in Erie County, New York